Olaf Ørvig (born 26 November 1889 in Kragerø – died 25 June 1939 in Bergen) was a Norwegian sailor who competed in the 1920 Summer Olympics. He was a crew member of the Norwegian boat Heira II, which won the gold medal in the 12 metre class (1919 rating).

References

External links
profile

1889 births
1939 deaths
Norwegian male sailors (sport)
Sailors at the 1920 Summer Olympics – 12 Metre
Olympic sailors of Norway
Olympic gold medalists for Norway
Olympic medalists in sailing
People from Kragerø
Medalists at the 1920 Summer Olympics
Sportspeople from Vestfold og Telemark